The E.J. Beardmore Dam, an earth-fill embankment dam with a concrete gravity wall across the Balonne River, is located in South West Queensland, Australia. The main purpose of the dam is for irrigation. The resultant reservoir is called Lake Kajarabie.

Location and features

See also

List of dams and reservoirs in Queensland

References

Dams completed in 1972
South West Queensland
Beardmore
Kajarabie
Embankment dams
Gravity dams